Pseudocrossotus pujoli is a species of beetle in the family Cerambycidae. It was described by Teocchi in 1991. It is known from Kenya, Somalia.

References

Crossotini
Beetles described in 1991